Ona "Oney" Judge Staines ( 1773 – February 25, 1848) was an enslaved woman of mixed races who was owned by the Washington family, first at the family's plantation at Mount Vernon and later, after George Washington became president, at the President's House in Philadelphia, then the nation's capital city. In her early twenties, she absconded, becoming a fugitive slave, after learning that Martha Washington had intended to transfer ownership of her to her granddaughter, known to have a horrible temper. She fled to New Hampshire, where she married, had children, and converted to Christianity. Though she was never freed, the Washington family did not want to risk public backlash in forcing her to return to Virginia and after years of failing to persuade her to return, the family stopped pressing her to go back.

Early life

Judge was born about 1773 at Mount Vernon, the estate of George Washington and his family. Her mother, Betty, was a slave, and her father, Andrew Judge, was a white English tailor working as an indentured servant at Mount Vernon. Though Judge was predominantly of European heritage, she was born into slavery under the premise of partus sequitur ventrem. She had a half-brother, Austin, born before 1757 (father unknown); a half-brother Tom Davis and a half-sister Betty Davis (fathered by white indentured weaver Thomas Davis); and a half-sister Delphy (father unknown). Delphy, born to Betty about 1779, lived until December 13, 1831. 

Betty had been among the 285 African slaves owned by Martha Washington's first husband, Daniel Parke Custis (1711–1757). Custis died without a will and so, his widow, Martha Dandridge Custis, received what was called a dower share of the estate, which meant, until her death, she was entitled to use of a third of her deceased husband's wealth, which included at least 85 slaves. Though Martha had some control over these dower slaves, she did not own them outright, the estate did, and so, she could neither free nor sell them. After Martha wed George Washington in 1759, Betty traveled with her to Mount Vernon, along with then-infant Austin. Under the legal principle of partus sequitur ventrem, incorporated into Virginia colonial law in 1662, because Betty was a slave and property of the Custis Estate, that meant that Austin, Ona and Delphy were also owned by the Custis Estate. Upon the completion of his indenture, Andrew Judge settled in Alexandria, Virginia, some 11 miles away, and did not maintain contact with his illegitimate family.

When she was around 10 years old, Judge was brought to live at the Mansion House at Mount Vernon, likely as a "playmate" for Martha Washington's (family of George Washington) granddaughter Nelly Custis. She eventually became the personal attendant or body servant to Martha Washington. In an interview in 1846, Ona said she had received no education under the Washingtons, nor religious instruction.

With the aid of Philadelphia's free black community, Judge liberated herself in 1796 and lived as a fugitive slave in New Hampshire for the rest of her life.

More is known about her than any other slave on the Mount Vernon plantation because she was twice interviewed by abolitionist newspapers in the mid-1840s.

The presidential households
In 1789 Washington took seven enslaved Africans, including Judge, then 16, to New York City (then the nation's capital) to work in his presidential household; the others were her half-brother Austin, Giles, Paris, Moll, Christopher Sheels, and William Lee. Following the transfer of the national capital to Philadelphia in 1790, Judge was one of nine enslaved persons, two of whom were female, Washington took to that city to work in the President's House, together with Austin, Giles, Paris, Moll, Hercules Posey, Richmond, Christopher Sheels, and "Postilion Joe" (Richardson).

Gradual Abolition Act

With the 1780 Gradual Abolition Act, Pennsylvania became the first state to establish a process to emancipate its slaves. However, no one was freed immediately. The process was to play out over decades and not end until the death of the last enslaved person in Pennsylvania.

The law immediately prohibited importation of slaves into the state, and required an annual registration of those already held there. But it also protected the property rights of Pennsylvania slaveholders—if a slaveholder failed to register his slaves, they would be confiscated and freed; but if a slaveholder complied with the state law and registered them every year, they would remain enslaved for life. Every future child of an enslaved mother would be required to work as an indentured servant to the mother's master until age 28, after which the child would be free. A slaveholder from another state could reside in Pennsylvania with his personal slaves for up to six months, but if those slaves were held in Pennsylvania beyond that deadline, the law gave them the power to free themselves. Congress, then the only branch of the federal government, was meeting in Philadelphia in 1780, and met there until 1783. Significantly, Pennsylvania exempted members of Congress from the Gradual Abolition Act.

A 1788 amendment to the state law closed loopholes – such as prohibiting a Pennsylvania slaveholder from transporting a pregnant woman out of the state (so the child would be born enslaved) and prohibiting a non-resident slaveholder from rotating his slaves in and out of the state to prevent them from establishing the six-month Pennsylvania residency required to qualify for freedom This last point would affect the lives of Judge and the other people enslaved in the President's household.

In March 1789, the U.S. Constitution was ratified, creating a federal government with three branches. New York City was the first national capital under the Constitution; it had no laws restricting slaveholding. In 1790, Congress transferred the national capital to Philadelphia for a ten-year period while the permanent national capital was under construction on the banks of the Potomac River. With the move, there was uncertainty about whether Pennsylvania's slavery laws would apply to officers of the federal government. By a strict interpretation, the Gradual Abolition Act exempted only slaveholding members of Congress. But there were slaveholders among the officers of the judicial branch (Supreme Court) and the executive branch, including the President of the United States.

Washington contended (privately) that his presence in Philadelphia was solely a consequence of the city's being the temporary seat of the federal government. He held that he remained a resident of Virginia, and should not be bound by Pennsylvania law regarding slavery. Attorney General Edmund Randolph – also an officer of the executive branch – misunderstood the Pennsylvania law and lost his personal slaves after they established a six-month residency and claimed their freedom. Randolph immediately warned Washington to prevent the President's House slaves from doing the same, advising him to interrupt their residency by sending them out of the state. Such a rotation was a violation of the 1788 amendment, but Washington's actions were not challenged. He continued to rotate the President's House slaves in and out of Pennsylvania throughout his presidency. He also was careful never to spend six continuous months in Pennsylvania himself, which could be interpreted as establishing legal residency.

Washington was on his Southern Tour in May 1791, when the first six-month deadline approached. Giles and Paris had left Pennsylvania with him in April; Austin and Richmond were sent back to Mount Vernon prior to the deadline to prevent them from qualifying for freedom. Martha Washington took Oney Judge and Christopher Sheels to Trenton, New Jersey, for two days to interrupt their Pennsylvania residency. Moll and Hercules were allowed to remain in Pennsylvania for a couple of days beyond the deadline, then traveled back to Mount Vernon with the First Lady.

A 1791 proposal in the Pennsylvania legislature to amend the Gradual Abolition Act to extend Congress's exemption to all slaveholding officers of the federal government was abandoned after heated opposition by the Pennsylvania Abolition Society.

In 1842, the U.S. Supreme Court ruled in Prigg v. Pennsylvania that the 1788 amendment to the Gradual Abolition Act – specifically the section that empowered Pennsylvania to free the slaves of non-resident slaveholders – was unconstitutional.

Escape

Judge fled as the Washingtons were preparing to return to Virginia for a short trip between sessions of Congress. Martha Washington had informed her that she was to be given as a wedding present (or otherwise later bequeathed) to Martha's granddaughter Elizabeth Parke Custis Law, known for her fierce temper. Judge recalled in an 1845 interview:
Whilst they were packing up to go to Virginia, I was packing to go, I didn't know where; for I knew that if I went back to Virginia, I should never get my liberty. I had friends among the colored people of Philadelphia, had my things carried there beforehand, and left Washington's house while they were eating dinner.

Runaway advertisements in Philadelphia newspapers document Judge's escape to freedom from the President's House on May 21, 1796. This one appeared in The Philadelphia Gazette on May 24, 1796:
Absconded from the household of the President of the United States, ONEY JUDGE, a light mulatto girl, much freckled, with very black eyes and bushy hair. She is of middle stature, slender, and delicately formed, about 20 years of age.

She has many changes of good clothes, of all sorts, but they are not sufficiently recollected to be described—As there was no suspicion of her going off, nor no provocation to do so, it is not easy to conjecture whither she has gone, or fully, what her design is; but as she may attempt to escape by water, all masters of vessels are cautioned against admitting her into them, although it is probable she will attempt to pass for a free woman, and has, it is said, wherewithal to pay her passage.

Ten dollars will be paid to any person who will bring her home, if taken in the city, or on board any vessel in the harbour;—and a reasonable additional sum if apprehended at, and brought from a greater distance, and in proportion to the distance.

FREDERICK KITT, Steward.
May 23

New Hampshire

Judge was secretly placed aboard the Nancy, a ship piloted by Captain John Bowles and bound for Portsmouth, New Hampshire. She may have thought she had found safe haven, but that summer she was recognized on the streets of Portsmouth by Elizabeth Langdon, the teenage daughter of Senator John Langdon and a friend of Nelly Custis. Washington knew of Judge's whereabouts by September 1, when he wrote to Oliver Wolcott Jr., the Secretary of the Treasury, about having her captured and returned by ship.

At Wolcott's request, Joseph Whipple, Portsmouth's collector of customs, interviewed Judge and reported back to him. The plan to capture her was abandoned after Whipple warned that news of an abduction could cause a riot on the docks by supporters of abolition. Whipple refused to place Judge on a ship against her will, but relayed to Wolcott her offer to return voluntarily to the Washingtons if they would guarantee to free her following their deaths.

An indignant Washington responded himself to Whipple:
I regret that the attempt you made to restore the Girl (Oney Judge as she called herself while with us, and who, without the least provocation absconded from her Mistress) should have been attended with so little Success. To enter into such a compromise with her, as she suggested to you, is totally inadmissible, for reasons that must strike at first view: for however well disposed I might be to a gradual abolition, or even to an entire emancipation of that description of People (if the latter was in itself practicable at this moment) it would neither be politic or just to reward unfaithfulness with a premature preference [of freedom]; and thereby discontent before hand the minds of all her fellow-servants who by their steady attachments are far more deserving than herself of favor.

Washington could have used the federal courts to recover Judge Staines — the 1793 Fugitive Slave Act (which he had signed into law) required a legal process to return an escaped slave over state lines. Any court case, however, would have been part of the public record, and attracted unwelcome attention.

Washington retired from the presidency in March 1797. In August 1799 he wrote to his nephew, Burwell Bassett Jr., requesting help in capturing Judge Staines. Bassett traveled to New Hampshire in September, and tried to convince her to return. By this point she was married to a seaman named Jack Staines (who was away at sea) and was the mother of an infant. Bassett met with her, but she refused to return to Virginia with him. Bassett was Senator Langdon's houseguest that night, and over dinner he revealed his plan to kidnap her. This time Langdon helped Judge Staines, secretly sending word for her to immediately go into hiding. Bassett returned to Virginia without her.

Following Judge's 1796 escape, her younger sister, Delphy, became the wedding present to Martha Washington's granddaughter. Eliza Custis Law and her husband manumitted Delphy and her children in 1807, after they were already living with her husband William Costin in Washington City.

Family

In New Hampshire, Ona Judge met and married Jack Staines, a free black sailor. Their January 1797 marriage was listed in the town records of Greenland and published in the local newspaper. They had three children:
Eliza Staines (born 1798, died February 14, 1832, New Hampshire, no known offspring)
Will Staines (born 1801, death date & location unknown, no known offspring)
Nancy Staines (born 1802, died February 11, 1833, New Hampshire, no known offspring)

In freedom, Judge Staines learned to read and became a Christian. She and her husband had fewer than 7 years together; he died on October 19, 1803. As a widow, Judge Staines was unable to support her children and moved in with the family of John Jacks Jr. Her daughters Eliza and Nancy became wards of the town and were hired out as indentured servants; her son Will was apprenticed as a sailor.

Judge Staines's daughters died fifteen years before she did. Her son reportedly never returned to Portsmouth.  After the elder Jacks died, Rockingham County donated firewood and other supplies to Judge Staines and the Jacks sisters, all by then too old to work.

Interviews on slavery

Interviews with Judge Staines were published in the May 1845 issue of The Granite Freeman and the January 1847 issue of The Liberator, both abolitionist newspapers. They contained a wealth of details about her life. She described the Washingtons, their attempts to capture her, her opinions on slavery, her pride in having learned to read, and her strong religious faith. When asked whether she was sorry that she left the Washingtons, since she labored so much harder after her escape than before, she said: "No, I am free, and have, I trust, been made a child of God by the means."

Never freed
George Washington died on December 14, 1799; he directed in his will that his 124 slaves be freed after his wife's death. Martha instead signed a deed of manumission in December 1800, and the slaves were free on January 1, 1801. The 153 or so dower slaves at Mount Vernon remained enslaved, as neither George nor Martha could legally free them.

Following Martha Washington's death in 1802, the dower slaves reverted to the Custis estate, and were divided among the Custis heirs, her grandchildren.

Judge Staines remained a dower slave all her life, and legally her children also were dower slaves, property of the Custis estate, despite the fact that their father, Jack Staines, was a free man. Article IV, Section 2 of the U.S. Constitution guaranteed the property rights of slaveholders whose slaves had escaped; this superseded Staines' parental rights.  Under the principle of partus sequitur ventrem, a child's status as slave or free followed that of the mother.

The Fugitive Slave Act of 1793 — passed overwhelmingly by Congress and signed into law by Washington — established the legal mechanism by which a slaveholder could recover his property. The Act made it a federal crime to assist an escaped slave or to interfere with his capture, and allowed slave-catchers into every U.S. state and territory.

Following Washington's death, Judge Staines probably felt secure in New Hampshire, as no one else in her family was likely to mount an effort to take her. But legally, she and her children remained fugitives until their deaths.  Her daughters predeceased her by more than a decade, and it is not known what happened to her son.

Judge Staines died in Greenland, New Hampshire, on February 25, 1848.

Legacy and honors
On February 25, 2008, the 160th anniversary of Judge's death, Philadelphia celebrated the first "Oney Judge Day" at the President's House site. The ceremony included speeches by historians and activists, a proclamation by Mayor Michael A. Nutter, and a memorial citation by the City Council.

"Oney Judge Freedom Day," the 214th anniversary of her escape to freedom, was celebrated at the President's House site on May 21, 2010. The President's House Commemoration: Freedom and Slavery in the Making of a New Nation, at 6th & Market Streets in Philadelphia, opened in December 2010. It includes a video about Oney Judge and information about all nine slaves held at the house. It also honors the contributions of African Americans to Philadelphia and the U.S.

On June 19, 2021, (Juneteenth), a Virginia State Historical Marker honoring Judge was unveiled near the Mount Vernon estate, it is placed near the Mount Vernon Post Office on the Mount Vernon Memorial Highway.

In popular culture
Books:
Taking Liberty (2002), novel by Ann Rinaldi
The Escape of Oney Judge (2007), children's book by Emily Arnold McCully
My Name Is Oney Judge (2010), children's book by Diane D. Turner
Oney: My Escape From Slavery (2017), novel by Diana Rubino and Piper Huguley
Never Caught: The Washingtons' Relentless Pursuit of Their Runaway Slave, Ona Judge (2017), biography by Erica Armstrong Dunbar
Never Caught, the Story of Ona Judge: George and Martha Washington's Courageous Slave Who Dared to Run Away (2017), Young Readers Edition by Erica Armstrong Dunbar and Kathleen Van Cleve
My Name is Ona Judge (2022), novel by Suzette D. Harrison

Theater:
A Thirst for Freedom (2000), play by Emory Wilson, produced at The Players' Ring Theater, Portsmouth, New Hampshire.
A House with No Walls (2007), play by Thomas Gibbons, initially produced at InterAct Theatre Company, Philadelphia, Pennsylvania, with subsequent productions throughout the United States.
Parallel Destinies (2010), dance/theater piece by choreographer Germaine Ingram, composer Bobby Zankel, and visual artist John Dowell, a work-in-progress at the Philadelphia Folklore Project.

Video:
Oney Judge's Escape from the Washingtons (2008), third episode of Drunk History. Stand-up comedian Jen Kirkman recounts Oney Judge's life for the Funny or Die web video series.
The Freedom Quest of Oney Judge (2015), video by HERO Live! Colonial Williamsburg supports American history education for students in grades 4–8. Using 21st century technology and dramatizations with re-enactors to play the roles of historical figures, the HERO Live! programs are correlated to standards, providing a compelling learning experience.

See also 
 List of enslaved people of Mount Vernon
 George Washington and slavery
 Samuel Osgood House  First Presidential Mansion
 Alexander Macomb House  Second Presidential Mansion
 List of enslaved people

Notes

References

Further reading

External links

"Two 1840s Articles on Oney Judge", The Granite Freeman (1845) and The Liberator (1847), at President's House website, US History
(Video) Silent No Longer: The Story of Oney Judge, Philadelphia Inquirer (via YouTube)

1770s births
1848 deaths
Year of birth uncertain
African-American Christians
Converts to Christianity
Mount Vernon slaves
Custis family of Virginia
People from Mount Vernon, Virginia
American rebel slaves